Pinoy Box Office (PBO; stylized in lowercase as pbo) is a Philippine pay television film channel owned by Viva Communications. Its programming consists of films produced and distributed by Viva Films. Aside from films, PBO occasionally plays music videos by recording artists under Viva, concerts of its artists, and some original TV series and a few talk shows exclusive to the channel, as well as airing shopping TV program EZ Shop and Island Living.

History
The channel was originally launched as Viva Cinema on May 6, 1996, in partnership between Viva Entertainment in the Philippines and Star TV (later simply rebranded as Star in 2001) in Hong Kong.

On July 10, 2003, Star announced that the joint venture with Viva Entertainment would not be renewed, meaning Viva Cinema would be closed down on July 31, 2003. On August 1, 2003, Viva Cinema was rebranded as Pinoy Box Office.

On August 1, 2021, after Viva TV was renamed as Viva Cinema, PBO carries the films that Viva produced since 1996 (in 2022 Produced since 1997). In the coming years, it is set to broadcast only the movies they produced from 2001 onwards.

Movie Jocks
Phoemela Baranda (2014–present)
Roxee B (2014–present)
Bea Rose Santiago (2016–present)
Mayton Eugenio (2016–present)
Shy Carlos (2017–present)
Bea Binene (2018-present)
 Kylie Versoza (2016-present)

References

See also
 Viva Entertainment
 Viva Television
 Viva Films
 Viva Cinema (TV channel) (formerly known as Viva TV)
 Cinema One
 Cine Mo!
 I Heart Movies
 Solar Flix

Viva Entertainment
Television networks in the Philippines
Movie channels in the Philippines
Filipino-language television stations
Television channels and stations established in 1996
1996 establishments in the Philippines